Classification of objects of the administrative-territorial system of Ukraine (KOATUU) (КОАТУУ), is a national standardization system established by the State Committee of Ukraine for the Technical Regulations and Consumer Policy on October 31, 1997, #659, and went into effect on January 1, 1998. 

KOATUU was directly inherited from and replaced the old Soviet system SOATO of the Soviet standard system GOST, practically without major structural changes (some nomenclatural). KOATUU is numbered as DK 014-97 in the system of classification and coding of technical-economical and social information in Ukraine (abbreviated as DSK TESI). The classification is conducted by the Scientific-research Institute of Statistics of the State Statistics Committee of Ukraine. DK 014-97 (KOATUU) is planned to be integrated in the International Organization for Standardization and to follow the designated system for Ukraine, ISO 3166-2:UA.

External links
 List of Regions of Ukraine on the website of the Ukrainian parliament
 General outlook
 

Encodings
Standards of Ukraine
Statistical data coding
Geocodes
Geographic classifications